Mary Jane Mageau (4 September 1934 – 9 January 2020) was an American born writer, harpsichordist and composer who had lived and worked in Australia since 1974. She was born in Milwaukee, Wisconsin, and studied at DePaul University, Chicago, and the University of Michigan where she studied with Leon Stein, Leslie Bassett and Ross Lee Finney, graduating with a Master of Music degree. In 1974 she accepted an Australian guest lectureship and there married architect Kenneth White, becoming an Australian citizen and resident of Queensland. She was particularly prominent in lobbying for opportunities for women composers.

Australian composer and pianist Larry Sitsky noted when reviewing her works, that Elite Syncopations, from Ragtime for Piano, was "a most attractive piece" and that when playing the work "the boundaries between Mageau and Joplin almost disappeared in my mind, and a rather satisfying whole emerged." Sitsky described her later works as more elegant and refined.

Mageau herself wrote of her artistic practice, "Through my music I always seek to communicate something fresh, new and expressive to the performer/s and listening public. Music must communicate - it must say something of meaning that will engage each listener in a satisfying artistic journey".

Mageau died in Queensland at the age of 85.

Honors and awards
Silver Medal, Louis Moreau Gottschalk International Composer's Competition
Alienor Harpsichord Concerto Competition for Composers, 1994
ASCAP Standard Award, granted annually since 1981
Commendation, Vienna Modern Masters First Recording Awards, 1990

Works
Selected works include:
Triple Concerto for piano trio and orchestra
Better Way for treble choir with piano
Ragtime Remembered for quintet (2001)
She Is a Cat for soprano and piano (2000)
Ragtime Remembered for solo piano (2000)
Contrasts in Continuum for unaccompanied viola (1968)
Statement and Variations for viola solo (1979)
Calls from the Heartland for violin with piano (1995)	
Preludes for Patricia, 4 Short Pieces for 2 violas or solo viola with prerecorded tape (1996)
Moonlight Reflected on Water for unaccompanied piano (1984)	

Her music has been recorded and issued on CD, including the Vienna Modern Masters Music From Six Continents CD Series.

Mageau is the author of two spiritual books; Insights : for an awakening humanity and A little book of living spiritually, published by Boolarong Press and poetry published in the United States by Red Moon Press, the MET Press, and in Australian and Canadian literary magazines.

References

External links
 Mary Mageau at the Australian Music Centre
 Mary Mageau Obituary from the Australian Music Centre

1934 births
2020 deaths
20th-century classical composers
American classical composers
American women classical composers
Australian classical composers
Australian women classical composers
Australian music educators
Women music educators
20th-century American women musicians
20th-century American composers
20th-century women composers
DePaul University alumni
University of Michigan School of Music, Theatre & Dance alumni
American emigrants to Australia
21st-century American women